Thymops birsteini, the Patagonian lobsterette, is a species of lobster found around the coasts of South America, particularly the South Atlantic. It belongs to the monotypic genus Thymops.

Distribution
T. birsteini is found on the continental shelf around South America, particularly in the Argentine Sea. In the Atlantic Ocean, it is found south of 37° south, with Uruguay representing the northern extremity of its distribution; on the Chilean (Pacific) side, it is found south of 51° south. Its range includes the areas around the Falkland Islands (Islas Malvinas) and areas near South Georgia, extending as far south as 57°, close to the Antarctic Peninsula.

Description
T. birsteini resembles a typical lobster, with two large claws, four other pairs of pereiopods, and a long pleon (tail). The carapace is granular, especially in the front half, and it bears a rostrum which divides into two points at its tip. Smaller individuals are found in shallower waters, and larger individuals are found at greater depths (up to ). There is also latitudinal variation in colour, with northern individuals being pale yellow, while those from further south are maroon.

Ecology
Little is known about the biological interactions of T. birsteini. It is occasionally eaten by the Patagonian toothfish Dissostichus eleginoides. It seems to prefer muddy bottoms, and has been observed entering and exiting burrows.

Life cycle
As in other pleocyemates, T. birsteini broods its eggs on the female's pleopods. One female may carry up to 380 eggs, each  in diameter. This extended larval release has previously been found in other sub-Antarctic decapods, and is an adaptation to the low temperature, the long time taken for brooding, and the low overall fecundity.

Edibility
The meat of T. birsteini is reported to be excellent, and it is thought that the species could be commercially exploited if sufficient concentrations could be discovered.

References

True lobsters
Crustaceans of the Atlantic Ocean
Monotypic arthropod genera
Edible crustaceans
Western South American coastal fauna
Fauna of Temperate South America